Potassium thiosulfate, commonly abbreviated KTS, is an inorganic compound with the formula K2S2O3. This salt can form multiple hydrates, such as the monohydrate, dihydrate, and the pentahydrate, all of which are white or colorless solids.  It is used as a fertilizer.

Formation and reactions

Thiosulfate salts are produced by the reaction of sulfite ion with elemental sulfur, and by incomplete oxidation of sulfides. For example, this salt is produced by  reacting potassium hydroxide with ammonium hydroxide, sulfur dioxide, and elemental sulfur. Thiosulfates are stable in neutral or alkaline solutions, but not in acidic solutions, due to disproportionation to sulfur dioxide and sulfur:
 + 2 H+  → SO2 + "S" + H2O

Due to this property, it can sequester metals, especially iron.

Thiosulfate reacts with iodine to give tetrathionate, in this case potassium thiosulfate reacts with iodine to produce potassium tetrathionate and potassium iodide:
2 K2  + I2 → K2  + 2 KI

Thiosulfate extensively forms diverse complexes with transition metals.  In the era of silver-based photography, thiosulfate was consumed on a large scale as a "stop" reagent. This application exploits thiosulfate's ability to dissolve silver halides. Thiosulfate is also used to extract or leach gold (sodium thiosulfate) and silver from their ores as a less toxic alternative to cyanide.

Uses
Potassium thiosulfate is commonly used as a fertilizer alone or with urea and/or urea ammonium nitrate due to its ability to delay nitrification. It thus has the ability to reduce the emission of nitrous oxide. It can also reduce the amount of fumigants being released from the soil. If used alone it is used in very dilute solution due to its ability to cause phytotoxicity symptoms. This is caused by the elemental sulfur being oxidized to produce sulfuric acid.

References

Potassium compounds
Thiosulfates